Donovan Grobbelaar (born 30 July 1983) is a New Zealand former cricketer who plays for Auckland. He made his List A debut in February 2013 in the 2012–13 Ford Trophy.

Beginning in the 2021/22 season Grobbelaar became the Performance and Talent Coach of the Auckland Hearts

See also
 List of Auckland representative cricketers

References

External links
 

1983 births
Living people
New Zealand cricketers
Auckland cricketers
People from Standerton
South African emigrants to New Zealand
Naturalised citizens of New Zealand